{{Infobox official post
| post = Governor
| native_ name = 
| insignia = Seal of Odisha.png
| insigniasize = 250
| insigniacaption = Emblem of Odisha
| image = Collage of Ratha Jatra and Head of States Governor and CM (cropped).jpg
| imagesize = 
| incumbent = Prof. Ganeshi Lal
| incumbentsince = 
| style = His Excellency
| residence = Raj Bhavan, Odisha, Bhubaneswar
| termlength = Five Years
| appointer = President of India
| formation = 
| inaugural = Kailash Nath Katju
| website = 
| body = Odisha
}}               

The governor of Odisha''' is the head of state and representative of the president of India in the Indian state of Odisha. The governors have similar powers and functions at the state level as those of the President of India at central level. They exist in the state appointed by the President of India for a term of 5 years and they are not local to the state that they are appointed to govern. The factors based on which the President evaluates the candidates is not mentioned in the constitution. The governor acts as the nominal head whereas the real power lies with the Chief Minister of the State and their council of ministers whereas they acts as the nominal head.The current incumbent is Prof. Ganeshi Lal since 29 May 2018.

Governors of Odisha

See also
 Government of Odisha                      
 Governors of states of India
 List of Governors of Bihar and Orissa
 List of Governors of Indian states

External links
  (Governor's Official Residence)

Odisha
 
Governors